"Song on the Radio" is a composition by Al Stewart introduced on his 1978 album release Time Passages.

Background

"Song on the Radio" was released in January 1979 as the second single from the Time Passages album, following the title cut which had been a Top Ten hit on the Hot 100 in Billboard magazine whose Adult Contemporary chart had afforded "Time Passages" a ten week tenure at No. 1

"Song on the Radio" would peak at No. 29 on the Hot 100 and rise as high as No. 10 on the Billboard Adult Contemporary chart

In Canada "Song on the Radio" also peaked at  No. 29 on the national hit parade as ranked by RPM magazine whose Adult Contemporary chart afforded the track a peak of No. 3.

Chart performance

Weekly charts

Year-end charts

References

1979 singles
Al Stewart songs
Arista Records singles
1978 songs
Song recordings produced by Alan Parsons
Songs about radio